"Tonight" is a single by British R&B artist Jay Sean. The single was released on 18 January 2009 (iTunes) and 26 January 2009 (CD single), but the music video for the single was released much earlier, on 17 November 2008. The single is the fourth and final single from his second album My Own Way.

History
On 15 October 2008, Jay Sean announced that he had signed with American Hip-Hop label Cash Money Records, on the back scene at MOBO Awards. Jay explained "It’s always been a dream for me to sign to an American label. And it’s great to be accepted by the best in the game".

The single includes a remix featuring rapper Lil Wayne, as Cash Money Records is releasing a remix in order to introduce Jay Sean to the American market. However the remix was canceled, and Sean recorded a new single for the American market called "Down" featuring Lil' Wayne.

My Own Way: Deluxe Edition was released on 16 February 2009 in the U.K. was set for release in the U.S., however the idea has been shelved and Jay Sean is working on a new album for the American market. The lead single is "Tonight" which was released on 26 January 2009. The album also has 2 additional songs, "Never Been in Love" and "I'm Gone", and 4 additional remixes.

On 21 April 2009, Harj D released a remix for "Tonight", called "Tonight (XS-Bass Remix)". The remix is the first exclusive remix after XS-BASS latest album Amplified which came out in 2008.

Formats and track listings

Charts

Weekly charts

Year-end charts

External links
Jay Sean - 'Tonight' - *EXCLUSIVE* (Official Musicvideo)

References

2009 singles
Jay Sean songs
Songs written by Jay Sean
Songs written by Claude Kelly
2008 songs
2Point9 Records singles